The royal clergy was the clergy in the service of the King of Norway in the Middle Ages. It refers to the priests of the 14 royal "chapels" throughout Norway, and is a modern term used by historians. From 1308, during the reign of Haakon V of Norway, the royal clergy became a separate institution, largely independent of the church hierarchy in Norway. They were granted vast privileges by the king and were also large land-owners. The royal clergy played its most central role during the Late Middle Ages, when they effectively formed the Norwegian state administration. The provost of the royal chapel of Oslo, St Mary's Church, was independent of the Bishop of Oslo as the "chapel" (which was one of the largest and most impressive churches of Norway) had its own cathedral chapter. In 1314, King Haakon decreed that the provost of St Mary's Church should "for eternity" also hold the office of Chancellor of Norway. In 1300, the clergy of St Mary's Church were also granted high secular aristocratic rank.

The royal clergy also formed a basis from which the King could recruit competent men loyal to the King to other high offices. The royal clergy had a large degree of meritocracy for its time, as the positions were not hereditary, which ensured competent and well educated recruitment. On the other hand, most of the royal clergy—especially those who rose to its upper echelons such as canon and provost—were recruited from the lower nobility, and sometimes from the high nobility. Peter Andreas Munch describes the royal as a counterweight to the regular secular aristocracy with a stronger loyalty to the king and a stronger service element than both the secular and the ordinary ecclesiastical aristocracy.

As the bishops with seats in the Council of the Realm grew in influence in the late Middle Ages, the royal clergy formed an important counterweight. The Royal clergy was dissolved in 1545.

List of members

The following list contains known members of the Royal Clergy.

See also
 Norwegian nobility

References

Christianity in medieval Norway